The 2011–12 Texas–Pan American Broncs men's basketball team represented the University of Texas–Pan American in the 2011–12 college basketball season. This was head coach Ryan Mark's third season at UTPA. The Broncs play their home games at the UTPA Fieldhouse and are members of the Great West Conference. They finished the season 11–21, 5–5 in Great West play to finish in a tie for third place. They lost in the semifinals of the Great West Basketball tournament to North Dakota.

Media
The Broncs have all their home games televised online at http://www.utpa.edu/broncslive/. However no Broncs games are broadcast on the radio.

Roster

Schedule and results
Source
All times are Central

|-
!colspan=9| Regular season

|-
!colspan=9| 2012 Great West Conference men's basketball tournament

References

UT Rio Grande Valley Vaqueros men's basketball seasons
Texas-Pan American